Cerosterna is a genus of flat-faced longhorns beetle belonging to the family Cerambycidae, subfamily Lamiinae. The members are found in the Indomalayan realm. The name is commonly misspelled as Celosterna, an unjustified emendation of the original spelling, not valid under the ICZN.

List of species
 Cerosterna fabricii Thomson, 1865
 Cerosterna fasciculata Aurivillius, 1924
 Cerosterna javana White, 1858
 Cerosterna luteopubens (Pic, 1925)
 Cerosterna perakensis Breuning, 1976
 Cerosterna pollinosa Buquet, 1859
 Cerosterna pulchellator (Westwood, 1837)
 Cerosterna ritsemai Heller, 1907
 Cerosterna rouyeri Ritsema, 1906
 Cerosterna scabrator (Fabricius, 1781) 
 Cerosterna stolzi Ritsema, 1911
 Cerosterna variegata (Aurivillius, 1911)

References
 Cerosterna

Lamiini